General Gabriel Nizigama is a Burundian Police General who was the Chief Police Commissioner and later served as the Burundian Security Minister during the Presidency of Pierre Nkurunziza . In 2018, he was appointed Chancellor of the National Orders of the Republic of Burundi by Decree No. 100/0146 of 2018.

References 

Burundian politicians
Year of birth missing (living people)
Living people